French Corner is a remote unincorporated community in Payette County, Idaho, United States.

See also

References

Unincorporated communities in Payette County, Idaho
Unincorporated communities in Idaho